Evangelos "Vangelis" Alexandris (born February 2, 1951) is a Greek professional basketball coach and a retired professional player. During his playing career, his nickname was "The Tiger".

Club playing career
Alexandris played with Aris, PAOK, and Iraklis during his pro club career as a basketball player. With Aris, he won the Greek League championship in 1979. He was the Greek Cup Finals Top Scorer in 1982. With PAOK, he won the Greek Cup in 1984.

National team playing career
Alexandris played with the junior national teams of Greece. With Greece's junior national team, he won the silver medal at the 1970 FIBA Europe Under-18 Championship. He was also a member of the senior men's Greek national basketball team. With Greece's senior national team, he played at the 1972 Pre-Olympic Tournament, and the EuroBasket 1983.

Club coaching career
Some of the teams that Alexandris has coached during his career include: PAOK, Aris, Olympia Larissa, Maroussi, AEK Athens, and Gymnastikos S. Larissas. His biggest successes as a head coach in his career are winning the Saporta Cup championship with Maroussi during the 2000–01 season, and winning the FIBA EuroCup (later known as the EuroCup Challenge) title during the 2002–03 season, while he coached Aris.

Alexandris became the head coach of Aris for the second time in 2011. He then became the head coach of Panionios in 2014. In October 2015, Alexandris signed a contract with Iraklis Thessaloniki of the Greek A2 (Greek 2nd Division).

National team coaching career
In May 2013, Alexandris was hired to coach the senior men's Jordanian national basketball team. He coached Jordan's team at the 2013 FIBA Asia Championship.

References

External links
EuroCup Coaching Profile
FIBA Coaching Profile
FIBA.com Senior Profile
FIBA.com Junior Profile
FIBA Europe Profile
Greek Basketball Federation Profile 
The top of the Greek bench: Vangelis Alexandris 

1951 births
Living people
AEK B.C. coaches
Apollon Patras B.C. coaches
Aris B.C. coaches
Aris B.C. players
Greek basketball coaches
Greek men's basketball players
Gymnastikos S. Larissas B.C. coaches
Gymnastikos S. Larissas B.C. players
Irakleio B.C. coaches
Iraklis Thessaloniki B.C. coaches
Iraklis Thessaloniki B.C. players
Kavala B.C. coaches
Kolossos Rodou B.C. coaches
Maroussi B.C. coaches
Olympia Larissa B.C. coaches
Panionios B.C. coaches
P.A.O.K. BC coaches
P.A.O.K. BC players
Point guards